The village of Vík (or Vík í Mýrdal  in full) is the southernmost village in Iceland, located on the main ring road around the island, around  by road southeast of Reykjavík.

Despite its small size (750 inhabitants in Mýrdalshreppur as of January 2021) it is the largest settlement for some  around and is an important staging post, and thus it is indicated on road signs from a long distance away. It is an important service center for the inhabitants of and visitors to the coastal strip between Skógar and the west edge of the Mýrdalssandur glacial outwash plain.

Overview
In 1991, the US journal Islands Magazine counted the beach at Vík as one of the ten most beautiful beaches on Earth. Its stretch of black basalt sand is one of the wettest places in Iceland. The cliffs west of the beach are home to many seabirds, most notably puffins which burrow into the shallow soils during the nesting season. Offshore lie stacks of basalt rock, remnants of a once more extensive cliffline Reynisfjall , now battered by the sea. There is no landmass between here and the Antarctic and the Atlantic rollers can attack with full force. According to folklore, they are former trolls who tried to drag their boats out to sea only to be caught by the rising dawn. The sea around them is rather wild and stormy, so travelers will not be surprised to discover a monument to the memory of drowned seamen on the beach.

Contemporary legends note the story of a husband who found his wife taken by the two trolls, frozen at night. The husband made the two trolls swear to never kill anyone ever again. His wife was the love of his life, whose free spirit he was unable to provide a home for; she found her fate out among the trolls, rocks, and sea at Reynisfjara .

The village was affected by volcanic ash during the 2010 eruptions of Eyjafjallajökull.

Danger from the Katla volcano
Vík lies directly south of the Mýrdalsjökull glacier, which itself is on top of the Katla volcano. Katla has not erupted since 1918, and as this is longer than typical dormant period, there has been speculation that an eruption may occur soon.  An eruption of Katla could melt enough ice to trigger an enormous flash flood, potentially large enough to obliterate the entire town. The town's church, located high on a hill, is believed to be the only building that would survive such a flood. Thus, the people of Vík practice periodic drills and are trained to rush to the church at the first sign of an eruption. The town has 1,400 hotel rooms for scientists and tourists, who are also briefed about Katla's dangers.

Climate
Like most of coastal Iceland, Vík í Mýrdal has a subpolar oceanic climate (Koppen Cfc) with cold but not severe winters and cool, short summers.

Sports
Ungmennafélagið Katla is a sports club based in Vík í Mýrdal.

In popular culture 
Vík í Mýrdal serves as the primary setting of Netflix's Icelandic original series Katla, which follows a group of the village's inhabitants as they struggle in the aftermath of the volcano's first eruption since 1918.

See also
List of settlements in Iceland
Reynisdrangar

References

External links

Beach at Reynisdrangar virtual tour

Populated places in Southern Region (Iceland)
Black sand beaches